Ceutholopha isidis is a species of snout moth in the genus Ceutholopha. It was described by Zeller in 1867, and is known from Algeria, Cyprus, Egypt, India, Pakistan, Sri Lanka, Afghanistan, Congo, Indonesia, Iran, Italy (Lampedusa), Mauritius, Morocco, Namibia, Nigeria, Réunion, South Africa, Sudan and the United Arab Emirates. One specimen was caught on 18 August 2012, at Dymchurch, England by J. E. Owen. The moth is either an adventive, or a possible immigrant because it arrived during a period of immigration.

The larvae feed on Acacia farnesiana, Acacia tortilis, Rhus oxyacantha and Acacia nilotica.

References

Moths described in 1867
Phycitini
Moths of Africa
Moths of Asia